Paraplectanoides is a genus of Australian orb-weaver spiders first described by Eugen von Keyserling in 1886.  it contains only two species.

References

Araneidae
Araneomorphae genera
Spiders of Australia
Taxa named by Eugen von Keyserling